The Tank Bund Road is a road in Secunderabad, Hyderabad, India. The Tank Bund dams Hussain Sagar lake on the eastern side and connects the twin cities of Hyderabad and Secunderabad. It has become an attraction with 33 statues of famous people from the region.

The Pakistan Patton tank, now an attraction for visitors to the Tank Bund Road, is a War Trophy given to the 54th Infantry Division, and is one that the Indian Army had disabled during the Battle of Basantar in Pakistan, between 15 and 17 December 1971.

Parallel to the Tank Bund Road, the Lower Tank Bund road was built to reduce traffic congestion. Lumbini Park is the nearest park to this road. The road is also a major point for street photography.

Statues of Icons along Tank Bund Road
34 well-sculptured bronze statues, mounted on high platforms, of people who played iconic role in the development of Hyderabad and Telugu culture along the Tank Bund road. The statues were installed by the then Chief Minister of Andhra Pradesh, N. T. Rama Rao. A committee with members from various regions of then Undivided Andhra Pradesh shortlisted personalities for the statues.

The following 34 personalities are commemorated in the order of appearance from Secunderabad.

Komaram BheemTribal leader from Telangana who openly fought against Nizam of Hyderabad with slogan Jal, jungal, zameen
Rudrama DeviThe 13th century Queen of the Kakatiya Dynasty which ruled over most parts of present-day Telangana and Andhra Pradesh
Mahbub Ali Khan, Asaf Jah VIFounder of the Asaf Jahi Dynasty
Sarvepalli RadhakrishnanFirst Vice President of India and second President of India
CR ReddyEducationist, political thinker, essayist, poet and literary critic
Gurajada ApparaoTelugu playwright, dramatist, poet, writer and humanist
Ballari Raghava Telugu playwright, thespian and film actor
Alluri Sita Rama Raju Indian Telugu revolutionary who fought against the British raj
Sir Arthur CottonBritish irrigation engineer instrumental in building the Prakasam Barrage, the Dowleswaram Barrage and the Kurnool Cuddappah Canal (K. C. Canal) 
Tripuraneni Ramaswamy Chowdary Telugu lawyer, poet, playwright, reformer, rationalist and humanist
Pingali VenkayyaIndian freedom fighter and the designer of the flag on which the Indian national flag was based
Kandukuri VeeresalingamSocial reformer and Telugu writer
Makhdoom MohiuddinUrdu poet, Marxist political activist and a forerunner of Telangana Rebellion against the Nizam of Hyderabad
Suravaram PratapareddySocial historian from Telangana
Gurram JashuvaTelugu poet and Dalit activist
 Mutnuri Krishna RaoIndian freedom fighter, editor, scholar and literary critic
 Sri Sri Telugu poet and lyricist
 Raghupathi Venkataratnam NaiduIndian social reformer
ThyagarajaRenowned composer of Carnatic music 
Ramadasu17th-century Indian devotee of Lord Rama and a composer of Carnatic music
Sri KrishnadevarayaThe Emperor of the Vijayanagara Empire who reigned from 1509 to 1529
 KshetrayyaTelugu poet and composer of Carnatic music
Potuluri Virabrahmendra Swami Hindu saint, who lived in Andhra Pradesh
Bramha NaiduMinister in a Medieval Andhra kingdom of Palnadu 
Molla Telugu poet who authored the Telugu-language Ramayana
Tana Shah Last ruler of the Qutb Shahi dynasty
Siddhendra YogiInventor of Modern form of Classical dance Kuchipudi 
Yogi VemanaTelugu poet and philosopher 
Potana Telugu poet best known for his translation of the Bhagavata Purana from Sanskrit to Telugu
Annamacharya15th-century Hindu saint and the earliest known Indian musician to compose songs called sankirtanas in praise of the Lord Venkateswara, a form of Vishnu
 Yerrapragada Medieval Telugu poet 
TikkanaSecond poet of the "Trinity of Poets (Kavi Trayam)" that translated Mahabharata into Telugu
Nannayya Telugu poet and the first in Trinity of poets (Kavitrayam), who authored Andhra mahabharatam, a Telugu retelling of the Mahabharata
Gautamiputra Satakarni (Shalivahanudu)Ruler of the Satavahana Empire in present-day Deccan region of India

References

Roads in Hyderabad, India